Da Filicaja is the name of noble Tuscan family, of ancient Roman origins, from Pontassieve (province of Florence, Italy).

Its most famous member is the late-17th-century poet Vincenzo da Filicaja.

See also
 Filicaja

Filicaja